Cascade Yachts was a pioneering U.S.-based builder of fiberglass monohull sloop-rigged sailboats ranging in sizes from 23 to  in length. It was founded in 1954 in Portland, Oregon by a group of local sailors interested in experimenting with fiberglass sailboat construction.

History
In 1954 the company was launched by five sailors under the name Yacht Constructors. The first design, the  Chinook, came from the desk of well-known Philadelphia naval architect Frederick Geiger, adapted from a wood design. The first five were launched in 1956-1957 to the founders, and began winning local races and gathering attention in the press. Eventually 70 were produced, making it arguably the first production fiberglass sailboat.

Robarta A. Smith, a former Sparkman & Stephens designer, would later design a series of boats for the company:
 Cascade 29 1961 360 were eventually produced.
 Cascade 42 1964
 Cascade 36 1967
 Cascade 23 1977
 Cascade 24 1977
 Cascade 27 1978

Like many early producers of fiberglass boats, the company's production methods resulted in yachts that were heavier than later builders. The test samples repelled .45 slugs and became the foundation of the company's reputation for producing bulletproof yachts. In various cases Cascade Yachts have been dropped off slings, fallen off a trailer at highway speed, and submerged in a mudslide, and suffered little consequential damage. Many Cascade hulls were sold in various stages of completion for owners to finish the interiors.

In 1989 the company's assets were sold to a new owner who continued production under the name Cascade Yachts.

In 2007 the company was sold to Russell Mead and moved to Warrenton, Oregon.

Notable Voyages
 Walt Wilson, a former police officer, completed a six-year,  circumnavigation in the Cascade 29 Euphoria.
 Jim and Molly Moore's Cascade 36 Swan did a four-year circumnavigation, detailed in their book "By Way of the Wind."
 Eighty-year-old Josh Taylor completed an eleven-year round the world voyage in the Cascade 36 Comitan.
 A Cascade 42 syndicate from the Portland Yacht Club raced seven consecutive Transpacific Yacht Race, from 1967 to 1979. Their best place was 3rd in 1969, the best time 11 days, 15 hours.
 64-year-old Ed Hart, on Hooligan, a Cascade 29, completed an unplanned circumnavigation.
 Portland, Oregon based Joby Easton and Bill Huseby sailed Cascade 36 Rain Drop to win their division and claim overall honors in the 2008 Pacific Cup (from San Francisco, California to Oahu, Hawaii), and were also awarded the Navigator's Trophy and the Latitude 38 Performance Trophy.
 AJ Goldman finished after deadline in the 2010 Singlehanded Transpac, in Cascade 36 Second Verse

See also
 List of sailboat designers and manufacturers

Notes

References
 The Circumnavigators. Don Holm, 1974
 Sailboatdata.com
 ONE STORM, TWO MUGGINGS, A COLLISION AND CIRCUMNAVIGATION
 Cascade Yachts: Building Boats for the Long Run, Peter Marsh.
 Latitude 38, Rain Drop Takes Pac Cup
 Latitude 38, West Coast Circumnavigators

External links
 Cascade Yachts Site
 Cascade Owners Group

American boat builders
Companies based in Portland, Oregon
Design companies established in 1954
Shipbuilding companies of Oregon
Clatsop County, Oregon
1954 establishments in Oregon
Manufacturing companies established in 1954